Hawkins House may refer to:

in Ireland
Hawkins House, former head office of the Department of Health (Ireland)

in the United States (by state then city)
Hawkins House (Prescott, Arizona), listed on the NRHP in Yavapai County, Arizona
Hawkins House (Foreman, Arkansas), listed on the NRHP in Little River County, Arkansas
Dr. M.C. Hawkins House, Parkdale, Arkansas, listed on the NRHP in Ashley County, Arkansas
Joel and Rena Hawkins House, Hollister, California, listed on the NRHP in San Benito County, California
Hull-Hawkins House, Live Oak, Florida, NRHP-listed
Baker-Hawkins House, Louisville, Kentucky, listed on the NRHP in Portland, Louisville, Kentucky
Hawkins House (Scott County, Kentucky), listed on the NRHP as Cantrill House
Nathan Hawkins House, Kirksville, Kentucky, listed on the NRHP in Madison County, Kentucky
Lorenzo D. Hawkins House, Stoneham, Massachusetts, NRHP-listed
Dr. E.P. Hawkins Clinic, Hospital and House, Montrose, Minnesota, listed on the NRHP in Wright County, Minnesota
Leport-Toupin House, Carson City, Nevada, also known as Hawkins House, NRHP-listed 
Hawkins House (Reno, Nevada), NRHP-listed
Hawkins Hall, Plattsburgh, New York, NRHP-listed
Hawkins Homestead, Stony Brook, New York, NRHP-listed, also known as Zachariah Hawkins Homestead
Robert Hawkins Homestead, Yaphank, New York, NRHP-listed
Pleasant Hill/Hawkins House, Middleburg, North Carolina, listed on the NRHP in Vance County, North Carolina
Hawkins-Hartness House, Raleigh, North Carolina, listed on the NRHP in Wake County, North Carolina
William J. Hawkins House, Ridgeway, North Carolina, listed on the NRHP in Warren County, North Carolina
Hawkins House (Houston, Texas), listed on the NRHP in Harris County, Texas
William and Eliza Hawkins House, Beaver, Utah, listed on the NRHP in Beaver County, Utah
Munro-Hawkins House, Shaftsbury Center, Vermont, listed on the NRHP in Bennington County, Vermont
E. B. Hawkins House, Fayetteville, West Virginia, listed on the NRHP in Fayette County, West Virginia